The Black Lunch Table (BLT) is a United States-based oral-history archiving project founded in 2005, focused on the lives and work of Black artists. Its work includes oral archiving, salons, peer teaching workshops, meetups, and Wikipedia edit-a-thons. The BLT brings people together to engage in dialogues about the writing, recording, and promoting inclusive art history. One of its aims is to address the racial and gender bias on Wikipedia by encouraging Wikipedia articles about African-American artists.

History 
Artists Jina Valentine and Heather Hart founded the Black Lunch Table (BLT) in 2005 with an event at the Skowhegan School of Painting and Sculpture artist residency. The BLT has hosted edit-a-thons at a range of institutions and settings including Boston University, Rutgers, The New School, BRIC Arts Media, and others. As of 2020, the organization has hosted 72 Wikipedia events in six countries, creating 385 new articles and uploading 727 new images.

References

External links 

 Wikipedia: Meetup page - Black Lunch Table

African-American arts organizations
African-American history of Maine
American artist groups and collectives
American writers' organizations
Artist groups and collectives based in Chicago
Organizations established in 2005
Skowhegan School of Painting and Sculpture
Social justice organizations
Social welfare charities based in the United States
Wikipedia